Mahtab or (DMG) Mahtāb ("moonlight", "the fullmoon", splendor of the "moon") is a Persian female given name. It is a popular given name in Iran and Turkey, where it is rendered as Mehtap. Notable people with the name include:

People

First name
Mahtab Farid (born 1985), American journalist
Mahtab Keramati (born 1970), Iranian actress
Mahtab Parsamehr (born 1989), Iranian archer
Mahtob Mahmoody (born 1979), American author
Mahtab Norouzi (c. 1934–2012), Iranian Baluchi master artisan in needlework
Mehtab Kaur, Maharani of the Sikh Empire

See also
Mehtab (disambiguation)
Mehtap (disambiguation)

References

External links

 - Mahtab written in Persian calligraphy

Persian feminine given names